Aplaviroc (INN, codenamed AK602 and GSK-873140) is a CCR5 entry inhibitor that belongs to a class of 2,5-diketopiperazines developed for the treatment of HIV infection. It was developed by GlaxoSmithKline.

In October 2005, all studies of aplaviroc were discontinued due to liver toxicity concerns. Some authors have claimed that evidence of poor efficacy may have contributed to termination of the drug's development; the ASCENT study, one of the discontinued trials, showed aplaviroc to be under-effective in many patients even at high concentrations.

See also 
 CCR5 receptor antagonist

References

Further reading 
 

Abandoned drugs
Benzoic acids
Diketopiperazines
Entry inhibitors
Hepatotoxins
Spiro compounds
Diphenyl ethers
Butyl compounds